Sub Lieutenant  was a Japanese student who joined the Imperial Japanese Navy. On May 11, 1945, he flew a kamikaze suicide mission against  during the Battle of Okinawa near the end of World War II.

Early life
Yasunori was born on a farm outside of Akō, Hyōgo Prefecture.

Military career and death
Kamikaze pilots were generally 18–20 years old, poorly trained, and flew poorly maintained aircraft. As leader of the Navy's Kamikaze Corps 7th Showa Special Attack Squadron, he led a group of four young men to attack US Navy ships. Yasunori led a group of six planes which departed Kanoya Air Base between 0640 and 0653 on May 11, 1945. The bomb tore a hole in the port side of the ship and his plane crashed onto the flight deck. The ensuing explosion destroyed many of the planes on the deck. His plane dragged another plane overboard. His wingman, Kiyoshi Ogawa, crashed into the ship a few seconds later. A third plane crashed into the sea before reaching the ship. The fate of the remaining three planes is unknown. He and his wingman killed 393 Americans and wounded an additional 264. It was the most devastating suicide attack in the Pacific War. Three hundred fifty-two of the dead were buried at sea the next day.

References

Imperial Japanese Navy personnel of World War II
Suicides in Japan
1945 deaths
Kamikaze pilots
Japanese military personnel killed in World War II
Imperial Japanese Navy officers
1924 births